Unidad de Inteligencia Financiera (Financial Intelligence Unit) or UIF is an administrative unit of Mexico's Secretariat of Finance and Public Credit responsible for receiving, analyzing and disseminating information related to the prevention, detection and combat to the violations of operations with illegal resources such as money laundering and terrorist-financing activities. Its main source of information are the reports and notices provided by the financial institutions in the country.

The UIF was created on 7 May 2004, during the presidency of Vicente Fox Quesada.

Agency Executives

References

See also
Secretariat of Finance and Public Credit

Mexican intelligence agencies
Financial regulatory authorities